Sen-Sen was a type of breath freshener originally marketed as a "breath perfume" in the late 19th century by the T. B. Dunn Company and then produced by F&F Foods until they discontinued the product in July 2013. Sen-Sen bore a strong similarity to Vigroids, a liquorice sweet made by Ernest Jackson & Company, Ltd.

Sen-Sens were available in small packets or cardboard boxes. Similar to a matchbox of the time, an inner box slid out from a cardboard sleeve revealing a small hole from which the tiny Sen-Sen squares would fall when the box was shaken.

Sen-Sen's ingredients were liquorice, anise, gum arabic, maltodextrin, sugar, and natural and artificial flavors.

Popular culture
Sen-Sen's distinctive, strong scent, its nostalgic association with earlier time periods (particularly the 1930s through the 1960s), and its frequent use to cover up the odoriferous evidence of perceived vices such as drinking and cigarette smoking, led to many references in various media.

Michael Chabon describes, in The Amazing Adventures of Kavalier & Clay, the contents of a desk drawer..."clean sheets of foolscap, aspirin, Sen-Sen ..."
John D. Fitzgerald mentions it in his children's book "The Great Brain" as a way to mask the odor of alcohol consumption. 
Billy Joel's 1984 song "Keeping the Faith", about coming of age in the 1960s, mentions "a fresh pack of Luckies and a mint called Sen-Sen".
Stephen King's book Four Past Midnight has a story called the Library Policeman that mentions Sen-Sen.
A brief reference occurs in the 2004 Martin Scorsese motion picture, The Aviator. Howard Hughes and his press agent Johnny Meyer are speaking to each other at a "hip" Hollywood club. The pair are interrupted by a cigarette girl with the line: "Cigar, cigarettes, Sen-Sen?"
Another brief reference is in The Wayward Bus by John Steinbeck, Chapter 7.
Robert Culp in the 1959 CBS TV show "Trackdown" (Texas Rangers) lists items including Sen-Sen in the pocket of a dead man, Manny Brock, found shot in a hotel room.
IRS Agent Reginald Lawrence eats Sen-Sens in Walter Mosley's second Easy Rawlins novel, A Red Death (1991).
W. Somerset Maugham has a character in his 1915 novel Of Human Bondage called Miss Bennett, a buyer of petticoats in a department store, who chews Sen-Sens.
Robert Asprin has a character called "The Sen-Sen Ante Kid" in his novel Little Myth Marker. The character plays Dragon Poker and always starts the game by adding a Sen-Sen to the ante.
Robert Penn Warren references a character named Sen-Sen Puckett "who chewed Sen-Sen to keep his breath sweet". Character Marvin Frey is also described as having "...breath sweetly flavored with Sen-Sen and red-eye" in Warren's novel All the King's Men.
In Chuck Palahniuk's novel "Damned" sen-sen and other less desirable candies are scattered around Hell.
They are referenced in the song "Ya Got Trouble" from the 1957 musical comedy The Music Man (music and lyrics by Meredith Willson) as a way to cover up the smell of cigarettes.
Yogi Yorgesson (a stage name for comic Harry Stewart) recorded a parody of "My Little Grass Shack in Kealakekua, Hawaii" entitled "My Little Old Shack in Minneapolis, Minnesota". One line says, "Got a pocketful of Sen-Sen for my sweetheart Hedy Jensen".
In Zora Neale Hurston's novel "Their Eyes Were Watching God", chapter 9, it is told about Hezekia who works in Janie's store that "His sense of ownership made him honest too, except for an occasional jaw-breaker, or a packet of sen-sen. The sen-sen was to let on to the other boys and the pullet-size girls that he had a liquor breath to cover."
Zippy the Pinhead mentions Sen-Sen from time to time.
Another brief reference is in the third episode of season one in The Marvelous Mrs. Maisel by a jazz musician after smoking a joint.
In Betty Smith's classic A Tree Grows in Brooklyn, Francie's mom's old best friend Hildy O'Dair "chewed sen-sen, knew all the latest songs and was a good dancer". ch 7
In the Gwendolyn Brooks classic Maud Martha, a stranger who asked Maud Martha to dance as her husband dances with Maella "reeked excitingly of tobacco, liquor, pinesoap, toilet water and Sen Sen". ch 19
In the TV series M*A*S*H, Season 6, Episode 24, "Major Topper," a patient has difficulty swallowing pills. Colonel Potter is encouraging him to try it anyway when the patient says, "I can't swallow pills, Doc. I choke on sen-sen."
Another brief reference is in the Laverne & Shirley episode entitled "Good Time Girls" in season 2. Laverne said, "They got dates. I saw Lenny buying Sen-Sen."
In the 1973 movie Paper Moon in the General Store $20 scam scene, Ryan O'Neal buys a pack of Sen-Sen.
In Season 4, Episode 6, of King of Queens entitled "Ticker Treat", while Carrie's father Arthur is in the hospital being treated for a neurological shock which leaves him believing he's in his youth, he asks for a packet of Sen-Sen and a copy of Gent magazine.
In Thomas Harris's The Silence of the Lambs, Clarice Starling  uses Sen-Sen to describe her internal vision of Dr Chilton's life... "the ache of his whole yellow smiling Sen-Sen lonesome life"
Stephen King's book 11/22/63 mentions Sen-Sen: "I could smell Vitalis in his slicked-back hair and Sen-Sen on his breath" (166).
 In Margaret Laurence's novel: 'A Bird in the House' in the first short story; "The Sound of Singing" ~p.25 "...an Eskimo Pie for me and a packet of Sen-Sen for himself."
 In the John Hughes movie Uncle Buck, starring John Candy, a pack of Sen-Sen can be seen sitting on the dash of his vehicle while driving his brother's kids to school.
 Sen-Sen is mentioned in The Bluest Eye by Toni Morrison in reference to Mr. Henry. ″He smelled wonderful. Like trees and lemon vanishing cream, and Nu Nile Hair Oil and flecks of Sen-Sen.″ (15)

See also
List of breath mints
Pontefract cake

References

Brand name confectionery
American confectionery
Breath mints
Candy
Liquorice (confectionery)